Antikyra or Anticyra ( or Ἀντίκιρρα - Antíkirra or Ἀντίκυρρα - Antíkyrra or Ἀντίκυραι - Antíkyrae) was an ancient Greek city and polis (city-state) on the right bank of the Spercheios near its mouth on the Malian Gulf in district of Malis in Thessaly. To its south lay Mount Oeta. Both were famed for their black and white hellebore, a prized herb in ancient Greek medicine.

The editors of the Barrington Atlas of the Greek and Roman World tentatively identify the site of Anticyra at the modern village of Kostalexis (Κωσταλέξης) in the municipality of Lamia.



See also
 Phocian Antikyra, also the modern Antikyra
 Locrian Antikyra, a phantom city invented by Titus Livius

Notes

References

Further reading
 

Populated places in ancient Thessaly
Cities in ancient Greece
Malis (region)
Former populated places in Greece
Thessalian city-states